Pierre Baugniet (23 July 1925 – 1981) was a Belgian pair skater. With partner  Micheline Lannoy, he is the 1948 Olympic champion, the 1947 & 1948 World Champion, and the 1947 European champion.

Their win at the 1948 Olympics was the first and until 2022 only Winter Olympic gold medal for Belgium.

Results
(pairs with Micheline Lannoy)

References

External links
Lannoy and Baugniet at pairsonice.com
Lannoy and Baugniet perform a death spiral at the Olympics

1925 births
1981 deaths
Belgian pair skaters
Figure skaters at the 1948 Winter Olympics
Olympic figure skaters of Belgium
Olympic gold medalists for Belgium
Sportspeople from Antwerp
Olympic medalists in figure skating
World Figure Skating Championships medalists
European Figure Skating Championships medalists
Medalists at the 1948 Winter Olympics